The Weissenberg effect is a phenomenon that occurs when a spinning rod is inserted into a solution of elastic liquid. Instead of being thrown outward, the solution is drawn towards the rod and rises up around it.  This is a direct consequence of the normal stress that acts like a hoop stress around  the rod. The effect is a common example of Non-Newtonian fluid dynamics, such as they occur in polysterene polymer. 
The effect is named after Karl Weissenberg.

References

External links
The Isolation of, and the Initial Measurements of the Weissenberg Effect

Viscosity
Rheology